Frederick Baker (5 August 1851 – 14 September 1939) was an Australian cricketer. He played eight first-class cricket matches for Victoria between 1877 and 1883.

See also
 List of Victoria first-class cricketers

References

External links
 

1851 births
1939 deaths
Australian cricketers
Victoria cricketers
Place of birth missing